Trombidium southcotti is a species of mite in the genus Trombidium in the family Trombidiidae. It is found in Iran.

Name
The species is named in honor of doctor and scientist Ronald Vernon Southcott (1918–1998), who described another species in the same genus, T. breei.

References
 Synopsis of the described Arachnida of the World: Trombidiidae

Further reading
  (1996): Descriptions of the larva, deutonymph and adult of Trombidium southcotti sp. nov.(Acari: Trombidiidae) from Iran. Systematic & Applied Acarology 1: 157–165.

Trombidiidae
Endemic fauna of Iran
Animals described in 1996